The Pipe is a 2010 Irish documentary film about the Shell to Sea campaign, when a small village stood up to a Big Oil.

References

External links 

2010 films
Irish documentary films
Documentary films about fossil fuels
2010 documentary films
Corrib gas controversy
2010s English-language films